Green hat may refer to:

 Green Hat (software company), acquired by IBM in 2012
 Orientation of thinking in terms of new ideas in Edward de Bono's book Six Thinking Hats
 Green Hat Films, a US-based film company headed by Todd Phillips
 Green Hat, a 2004 film by Fendou Liu
 Green hat, the Ecclesiastical hat for a bishop
 The Green Hat, a 1924 novel by Michael Arlen
 Green hat (chinese idiom), a Chinese term for cuckold